The Archdeacon of Leeds, previously Archdeacon of Ripon, is a senior ecclesiastical officer within the Diocese of Leeds. As such he or she is responsible for the disciplinary supervision of the clergy within the four deaneries (Allerton, Armley, Headingley and Whitkirk) making up the archdeaconry of Leeds. Until 2014, the post was in the Diocese of Ripon.

Since the creation of the Diocese of Leeds on 20 April 2014 (approved by the General Synod on 8 July 2013) the archdeaconry forms the Leeds episcopal area. Paul Ayers has been incumbent archdeacon since from 28 February 2017.

List of archdeacons
The archdeaconry was founded (as the Archdeaconry of Ripon) on 31 August 1894, from the Archdeaconries of Richmond and of Craven
1895–1905 (ret.): Arthur Waugh
December 1905 – 1934 (d.): Lucius Smith, Bishop suffragan of Knaresborough
The archdeaconry was renamed the Archdeaconry of Leeds on 15 March 1921.
1934–1937 (res.): Paul de Labilliere, Bishop suffragan of Knaresborough
1937–1940 (res.): Donald Bartlett
1940–1950 (res.): Lovell Clarke
1950–1969 (ret.): Charles Ellison (afterwards archdeacon emeritus)
1969–1981 (ret.): Alfred Page (afterwards archdeacon emeritus)
1982–1992 (ret.): Tony Comber (afterwards archdeacon emeritus)
1992–2005 (ret.): John Oliver
2005–2012 (res.): Peter Burrows
201231 October 2016 (ret.): Paul Hooper
1 November 20162017 (acting): Arani Sen
28 February 2017present: Paul Ayers

References

 
Leeds, Archdeacon of